The Germany women's national under-18 and under-19 basketball team, is controlled by the German Basketball Federation, abbreviated as DBB, and represents Germany in international women's under-18 and under-19 (under age 18 and under age 19) basketball competitions.

See also
 Germany women's national basketball team
 Germany women's national under-17 basketball team
 Germany men's national under-19 basketball team

References

External links
Archived records of Germany team participations

Women's national under-19 basketball teams
Basketball